Rockwood Park may refer to different places:

Rockwood Park, Queens, a neighborhood in the New York City borough of Queens
Rockwood Park, Saint John, a city park located in Saint John, New Brunswick 
Rockwood Museum and Park, a  park located in Wilmington, Delaware, with the Rockwood Museum (a Victorian mansion) and  a historic garden